Obscurities may refer to:
Obscurities (Stephin Merritt album), 2011
Wives and Obscurities, a 1956 comedy film

See also
 Obscurity (disambiguation)